The 2013 Las Vegas Bowl was an American college football bowl game that was played on December 21, 2013, at Sam Boyd Stadium in Whitney, Nevada, in the Las Vegas Valley. The 22nd annual Las Vegas Bowl, it featured the Mountain West Conference champion Fresno State Bulldogs against the USC Trojans of the Pac-12 Conference. The game started at 12:30 p.m. PST and aired on ABC and Sports USA Radio.  It was one of the 2013–14 bowl games that concluded the 2013 FBS football season.  Sponsored by motor oil manufacturer Royal Purple, the game was officially known as the Royal Purple Las Vegas Bowl.  The Trojans won by a score of 45–20.

Teams

Fresno State Bulldogs

Continuing their conference success from the previous season which saw them finish 7–1 and sharing their conference title with Boise State, the Bulldogs did even better in the 2013 season.  Already having won the Mountain West Conference's West Division championship, the Bulldogs went on to win the first Mountain West Conference Championship Game, defeating Utah State by a score of 24–17, advancing to the Las Vegas Bowl by virtue of their victory.

This will be the Bulldogs' second Las Vegas Bowl; they had previously made the bowl in 1999, losing to the Utah Utes by a last-second field goal for a score of 17–16.

USC Trojans

The season was tumultuous by USC standards, having seen head coach Lane Kiffin fired five games into the season, and then interim head coach Ed Orgeron resigning at season's end (Clay Helton will serve as interim coach for the bowl game while Steve Sarkisian takes over for the 2014 season).  Nonetheless, the Trojans still managed a 6–3 conference and 9–4 overall record (tied with the rival UCLA Bruins for second in the Pac-12 South Division), leading them to the Las Vegas Bowl at season's end.

This will be USC's second Las Vegas Bowl; they had previously made the bowl in 2001, losing to future conference foe the Utah Utes by a score of 10–6.

Game summary

Scoring summary

Statistics

Notes
 Each school was allotted 11,000 tickets
 Cody Kessler was named the MVP in the game

References

Las Vegas Bowl
Las Vegas Bowl
Fresno State Bulldogs football bowl games
USC Trojans football bowl games
Las Nevada
December 2013 sports events in the United States